My Name Is Petersen is a 1947 Danish drama film directed by Christen Jul and starring Poul Reichhardt.

Cast
 Poul Reichhardt - Løjtnant John Petersen
 Helle Virkner - Aase Petersen
 Gunnar Lauring - Dr. med. Jens Petersen
 Asbjørn Andersen - Dr. med. Niels Henningsen
 Valdemar Skjerning - Professor Svend Holdrup
 Charles Tharnæs - Dr. med. Hans Wandrup
 Per Buckhøj
 Einar Juhl
 Grete Bendix - Fru Henningsen
 Ebba With - Sonja Mikkelsen
 Helge Matzen - Hansen

External links

1947 films
1947 drama films
1940s Danish-language films
Danish black-and-white films
Danish drama films